The 2012-13 Ligue 1 season was the 55th edition and current of the top-tier competition of Côte d'Ivoire football.

The season will start on 2 November 2012 and be in play until 31 July 2013. 

The Ivoirian Ligue 1 is back to its 2010 formula, consisting of a single group of fourteen teams, after it followed a revised format for two seasons following political problems in the country.

Team movement

Relegated from 2011 Ligue 1
Issia Wazi FC
ASC Ouragahio

Promoted to 2012-13 Ligue 1
CO Korhogo
SC Gagnoa

Teams

Table

See also
Ligue 1 (Côte d'Ivoire)
MTN

References

External links
Ligue 1 Côte d'Ivoire.com
Ivorian Football Federation
FIFA
MTNfootball.com
Rec.Sport.Soccer Statistics Foundation
Soccerway.com

Ligue 1 (Ivory Coast) seasons
Ivory Coast
1